Misaki is a collective term for divine spirits in Japan.

Misaki may also refer to:

Places
 Misaki, Chiba, a former town in Chiba Prefecture
 Misaki, Ehime, a former town in Ehime Prefecture
 Misaki, Kanagawa, a port in Miura, Kanagawa Prefecture
 Misaki, Okayama, a town in Okayama Prefecture
 Misaki, Osaka, a town in Osaka Prefecture
 Misaki Town (三咲町), a fictional town in the anime Tsukihime
 Misaki City (御崎市), a fictional town in the anime Shakugan no Shana

Other uses
 Misaki uma, a breed of pony native to Japan
 Misaki (name), a Japanese feminine given name

See also 
 Misak (disambiguation)